Kande Lansana is a Guinean footballer that currently plays for Bontang FC in the Indonesia Premier League.

References

Year of birth missing (living people)
Living people
Association football forwards
Guinean expatriate footballers
Guinean expatriate sportspeople in Indonesia
Guinean footballers
Expatriate footballers in Indonesia
Indonesian Premier League players
Bontang F.C. players